Richard Kissane (born 1868) was an Irish hurler who played for the Kerry senior team.

Kissane was a regular member of the starting twenty-one during Kerry's most successful hurling period shortly after the foundation of the Gaelic Athletic Association and the start of the inter-county championship. During his career he won one All-Ireland medal and one Munster medal.

At club level Kissane was a one-time county club championship medalist with Ballyduff.

References

1868 births
Year of death missing
Ballyduff (Kerry) hurlers
Kerry inter-county hurlers
All-Ireland Senior Hurling Championship winners